Literator may refer to several things:
 A literary person, a Man of Letters
 A writer, one who writes professionally, sometimes the original French term litterateur is used
 Literator (company), a formative assessment tool for teachers to track their students' reading performance through conferring